Papaver lapponicum is a species of poppy known by the common names Lapland poppy. It is endemic to  Lapland and western Siberia. It is a perennial herb.

References

External links

Mohn.tk

Flora of Siberia
Flora of Norway
lapponicum